Vícov is a municipality and village in Prostějov District in the Olomouc Region of the Czech Republic. It has about 600 inhabitants.

History
The first written mention of Vícov is from 1355.

References

Villages in Prostějov District